Canterwood is a census-designated place (CDP) located in Pierce County, Washington.

Demographics
In 2010, it had a population of 3,079 inhabitants. Of those, 1,473 are male and 1,606 are female.

Geography
Canterwood is located at coordinates 47°22′35″N 122°36′08″W.

References

Census-designated places in Pierce County, Washington